Ananda Wickramage (born August 4, 1953) is an actor in Sri Lankan cinema, stage drama and television. Wickramage is most notable for the role Mervyn in Paba teledrama, double acting in Patalavilla teledrama, president in political sitcom And Company and as Kotalawala in stage drama Neinage Suduwa.

Television career
Ananda Wickramage has acted more than 100 television serials. His role in the serials such as Patalavilla and Paba become highly popularized. He directed the television serial Menik Maliga, and Hada Pudasuna.

Notable works

 Ananthaya 
 And Company
 Aswenna
 Athuru Paara
 Bindunu Sith
 Bonda Meedum
 Dedunnen Eha
 Ekas Ginna
 Hada Pudasuna 
 Hapanaa
 Hathwana Kandayama 
 Ingammaruwa
 Itu Devi Vimana
 Jeewithaya Horu Aran 
 Kadathira
 Kadupul Mal
 Kammiththa
 Kathura
 Kokila Ginna
 Kulawanthayo
 Laabai Apple
 Malee 
 Manthri Hatana
 Nethaka Maayavee 
 Paba 
 Patalavilla
 Pata Veeduru
 Prema Parami
 Raja Bhavana
 Rosa Katu 
 Sanda Nodutu Sanda
 Sanda Sanda Wage
 Sankuru Maruthaya 
 Santhrase
 Senehase Nimnaya 
 Senuri
 Sepalika
 Shaun
 Sihil Sulan
 Short Cut
 Sikuru Udanaya 
 Suwanda Padma 
 Tharu Kumari
 Weda Mahaththaya

Filmography
Wickramage started his film career with Sudu Paraviyo back in 1977, with a minor role. Though he has acted more than 50 films across many genre, most of his characters remains supportive. His most popular cinema acting came through comedy roles in films Jeevithe Lassanai, Clean Out and Parliament Jokes. 
 
 No. denotes the Number of Sri Lankan film in the Sri Lankan cinema.

References

External links
Ananda Wickramage videos
'Hapana': Another story for kids from TBI

Sri Lankan male film actors
Sinhalese male actors
Living people
1953 births